Thapelo Sylvester Tshilo (born 18 February 1985) is a South African international footballer who played as a defender.

Career
Born in Boksburg, Gauteng, Tshilo began his career with Jomo Cosmos in 2001, turning professional in 2004. He signed for Mamelodi Sundowns in June 2010 and rejoined Cosmos on loan in 2011. He joined Bidvest Wits in January 2013 but failed to make a single appearance and he was released at the end of the season.

Tshilo joined newly promoted Premier Soccer League team Polokwane City in September 2013.

He also made one international appearance for South Africa in 2007.

References

1985 births
Living people
People from Boksburg
Association football defenders
South African soccer players
Jomo Cosmos F.C. players
Mamelodi Sundowns F.C. players
South Africa international soccer players
Bidvest Wits F.C. players
Polokwane City F.C. players
Moroka Swallows F.C. players
Sportspeople from Gauteng